The Field Elm cultivar Ulmus minor 'Cretensis' [:from Crete] was first mentioned by Nicholson in Kew Hand-List Trees & Shrubs Vol.2 (1896), as Ulmus campestris var. cretensis, without description. A 1908 herbarium specimen at Kew Gardens with an accompanying description (see 'External links') suggests that 'Cretensis' is not synonymous with Ulmus minor var. canescens, also present on Crete.

Description
On the Kew herbarium specimen Augustin Ley added the description: "All parts [of the shoots and upper leaf-surface] very glabrous and smooth; [on the leaf underside] axils and leaf-surface along mid-rib hairy; non glandular". The specimen shows obovate leaves, 4 to 6 cm long by 3 to 5 wide, with a small tapering tip, biserrate or triserrate margin, and a 5 mm petiole.

Pests and diseases
See under Ulmus minor.

Cultivation
It is not known whether 'Cretensis' remains in cultivation. An old field elm by the 11th-century Byzantine church of St Nicholas, Kyriakosellia, Apokoronas, western Crete, is in the locality where 'Cretensis' herbarium specimens were collected in the early 20th century (see 'External links'), and outside the small area in central Crete where 'Canescens' has been found. Sfikas (2011), however, refers to 'Canescens' in the Apokoronas area.

References

External links
 "Herbarium specimen 289491, herbariaunited.org" Sheet labelled Ulmus campestris var. cretensis (Kew Gardens Specimen, 1908; A. Ley)  
  Sheet labelled U. campestris (long-shoot specimen from Apokoronas, Crete, 1915) 

Field elm cultivar
Ulmus articles missing images
Ulmus
Missing elm cultivars